The Fallout is the debut studio album by American metalcore band Crown the Empire. It was released on November 19, 2012 through Rise Records and was produced by Joey Sturgis. It is the first album with new vocalist Dave Escamilla and the only album with founding keyboardist Austin Duncan, who left the band prior to the release.

Background and recording
Recording started in August 2012, when they entered the studio with Joey Sturgis. During the recording process, the band introduced Dave Escamilla as an official member and additional vocalist for the album.

For the deluxe edition of the album, the band re-recorded their EP Limitless and intended to release it as part of the deluxe reissue of the album in 2013, the difference being that they have incorporated Escamilla's vocals into them. Also for the release, they released "Limitless" as a single, which was released along with its own lyric video.

Release and promotion
The first single released off the album was "Makeshift Chemistry" on October 23, 2012. "Memories of a Broken Heart" was released on November 8, 11 days before the album's release. The album was made available to stream on November 15, the same day the music video for "The Fallout" was released.

The album itself was released on November 19, 2012 on CDs and digital download. The deluxe edition was released on December 9, 2013, which contained all seven tracks from the band's debut EP Limitless, re-recorded with David Escamilla.

Critical reception

The album received mixed reviews by critics. The AbsolutePunk review called the album's sound post-hardcore, and while it had good characteristics, it continued to call the album generic, and that the focus throughout the album was random, stating that at certain parts of the album, it can either have too much effort or not enough, and also went on to say that the lyrics were cliché however relate-able, and went on to praise the vocals and range of different vibes and sounds.

Alternative Press called the album's sound primarily metalcore although comparing its efforts and overall sound to the likes of The Dillinger Escape Plan, Botch and Breach, gave it a poor overview, and criticized its addition to dubstep sounds and elements throughout the album.

Track listing

Notes:
 On the deluxe reissue, the track "Graveyard Souls" is mis-titled as "Journals" for unknown reasons.
 Britni Michelle Horner and Denis Stoff do not reprise their roles as guest vocalists on the re-recorded versions of "Voices" and "Limitless" respectively; instead, they are both are replaced by Cassie Marin and co-lead vocalist Dave Escamilla.

Personnel
Credits adapted from AllMusic.

Crown the Empire
 Andrew "Andy Leo" Rockhold – lead vocals
 Dave Escamilla – co-lead vocals
 Bennett "Benn Suede" Vogelman – lead guitar, backing vocals
 Brandon Hoover – rhythm guitar, backing vocals
 Hayden Tree – bass
 Brent Taddie – drums, percussion
 Austin Duncan – keyboards, programming

Additional musicians
 Cassie Marin – guest vocals on "Voices"

Additional personnel
 Joey Sturgis – engineering, mastering, mixing, production
 Nick Scott – engineering
 Jeff Dunne – drum editing
 Brendan Barone – composition
 Crown the Empire – composition
 Derek Brewer – management
 JJ Cassiere and Tom Taaffe – booking
 Forfathers – art direction

Charts

References 

2012 debut albums
Rise Records albums
Crown the Empire albums
Albums produced by Joey Sturgis